Richard Marcus (born September 19, 1945) is an American actor who is best known for his roles in St. Elsewhere, Tremors, and The Pretender.

Actor
Richard Marcus' first role was on the television show The White Shadow, guest starring in two episodes. He worked steadily throughout the 1980s, and landed a recurring role (as Ralph, the Bird-Man) on the acclaimed NBC drama St. Elsewhere, for which he received an Emmy nomination.

He continued to act into the 1990s, and in 1996, he starred as Dr. William Raines on the television series The Pretender. He reprised his role in two television movies in 2001. Since The Pretender, Marcus has continued to act regularly, including guest starring in two episodes of 24 in 2005.

Filmography

*Uncredited

External links
 

American male film actors
American male television actors
Living people
1945 births
Place of birth missing (living people)